Güstrow-Land is an Amt in the district of Rostock, in Mecklenburg-Vorpommern, Germany. The seat of the Amt is in Güstrow, itself not part of the Amt.

The Amt Güstrow-Land consists of the following municipalities:

Ämter in Mecklenburg-Western Pomerania
Rostock (district)